The 2023 Mérida Open Akron was a WTA 250 tournament organised for female professional tennis players on outdoor hard courts as part of the 2023 WTA Tour. The event took place at the Yucatán Country Club in Mérida, Mexico, from 20 through 26 February 2023 as a replacement for Abierto Zapopan.

Champions

Singles

  Camila Giorgi def.  Rebecca Peterson, 7–6(7–3), 1–6, 6–2

Doubles

  Caty McNally /  Diane Parry def.  Wang Xinyu /  Wu Fang-hsien, 6–0, 7–5

Singles main draw entrants

Seeds

 Rankings are as of February 13, 2023.

Other entrants
The following players received wildcards into the singles main draw:
  Fernanda Contreras Gómez
  Katie Volynets
  Simona Waltert

The following player received entry using a protected ranking into the singles main draw:
  Nadia Podoroska

The following players received entry from the qualifying draw:
  Elina Avanesyan
  Kimberly Birrell 
  Léolia Jeanjean
  Ana Konjuh 
  Rebecca Peterson
  Lesia Tsurenko

The following player received entry as a lucky loser:
  Varvara Gracheva

Withdrawals 
 Before the tournament
  Kateryna Baindl → replaced by  Varvara Gracheva
  Dalma Gálfi → replaced by  Ysaline Bonaventure
  Donna Vekić → replaced by  Panna Udvardy

Doubles main draw entrants

Seeds 

 1 Rankings as of February 13, 2023.

Other entrants 
The following pairs received wildcards into the doubles main draw:
  Estelle Cascino  /  Jesika Malečková
  Despina Papamichail  /  Simona Waltert

References

External links

2023 in tennis
Tennis tournaments in Mexico
Mérida Open
Mérida Open